Happy Families is a play written by John Godber in 1991.

It is an autobiographical play set in Northern England and tells the story of a boy called John and his parents Vic and Dot. It tells of the stresses and strains of growing up with his family. It tells of how he grows up through his teenage years and through to when he gets his degree. Other characters within the play include Jack and Liz (John's grandparents), Doris and Edna (John's Aunties) and Rebecca (Edna's Daughter). It is a memory play and the narrative jumps back and forth from when John was about 9 until when he graduates with a degree as a drama teacher. John Godber has described it as "humour with a touch of sadness".

It takes its name from the card game of the same name - Happy Families.

External links
The Official Website of John Godber

Plays about families
1991 plays
Plays by John Godber
Plays set in England